Kristaq Mile (born 29 April 1958) is a former Albanian football player who is now a coach.

Playing career

Club
Mile played his entire career for hometown club Tomori Berat, only to finish his career at Skrapari.

International
He made his debut for Albania in a May 1985 FIFA World Cup qualification match against Poland, coming on as a second half substitute for Shkëlqim Muça. It remained his sole international appearance.

Managerial career
In March 2011 he replaced Përparim Daiu at the helm of Shkumbini, in November 2012 he succeeded Gugash Magani as coach of Shkumbini and in November 2013 he was appointed manager at Kastrioti. He was in charge of Naftëtari Kuçovë in the 2016-17 season.

Personal life
Mile's son Vangjel was a professional footballer who had spells in Finland and Norway.

References

External links

1958 births
Living people
Sportspeople from Berat
Association football midfielders
Albanian footballers
Albania international footballers
FK Tomori Berat players
KF Skrapari players
Albanian football managers
FK Tomori Berat managers
KS Lushnja managers
KF Bylis Ballsh managers
KF Teuta Durrës managers
Shkumbini Peqin managers
KS Kastrioti managers
Naftëtari Kuçovë managers
Kategoria Superiore managers
Kategoria e Parë managers